Fadumo Ahmed Alin was a Somali politician who served as the Assistant (Deputy) Minister of Education between 1974 and 1982. Alin, a teacher by profession, was the first woman elected to the Somali cabinet, and the first female minister in Somalia. On September 5th to 6th of 1993, she was a participant in a workshop on peace and conflict in Hargeisa.

References

 Bradbury, Mark. October 1993. The Somali Conflict: Prospects for Peace. Oxford: Oxfam UK and Ireland, p. 125.
 Mogadishu Domestic Service [Mogadishu, in Somali]. 2 February 1987. "Other Officials Named." (FBIS/DIRB Somalia Country File)
 Mogadishu Radio [Mogadishu, in Somali]. 7 February 1980. "New Somali Government." (BBC Summary 9 Feb. 1990/NEXIS )
 
 Refworld | Somalia: Information on the political career of Faduma Ahmed "Alim", including whether she was a member of parliament from 1979-1990 and served as deputy minister of education, and if so, whether she was elected or appointed or ever removed from the position, and if so, for what reasons, whether she was married to Ahmed Mohamoud Farah, who held several ministerial posts in the Barre government between 1970 and 1990, and if so, on his whereabouts today
 Halgan: Organ of the Somali Revolutionary Socialist Party, Utgåva 36–41

Women government ministers of Somalia
20th-century Somalian women